The 1981 Custom Credit Australian Indoor Championships was a men's tennis tournament played on indoor hard courts at the Hordern Pavilion in Sydney in Australia and was part of the 1981 Volvo Grand Prix. It was the ninth edition of the tournament and was held from 12 October through 18 October 1981. Top-seeded John McEnroe won his second successive singles title at the event.

Finals

Singles

 John McEnroe defeated  Roscoe Tanner 6–4, 7–5, 6–2
 It was McEnroe's 10th singles title of the year and the 34th of his career.

Doubles

 Peter Fleming /  John McEnroe defeated  Sherwood Stewart /  Ferdi Taygan 6–7, 7–6, 6–1
 It was Fleming's 7th title of the year and the 39th of his career. It was McEnroe's 16th title of the year and the 72nd of his career.

References

External links
 ITF tournament edition details

 
Custom Credit Australian Indoor Championships
Australian Indoor Tennis Championships
In
Custom Credit Australian Indoor Championships
Sports competitions in Sydney
Tennis in New South Wales